Tichipawa (meaning "thunderbolt" in the Quinault language) is a superlative Douglas fir near Lake Quinault in the U.S. state of Washington.

References

Sources

Further reading

Grays Harbor County, Washington
Individual trees in Washington (state)
Individual Douglas firs
Olympic National Forest